Jong Su-hyon (born 10 October 1996) is a North Korean ice hockey player. She competed in the 2018 Winter Olympics.

Career
Alongside South Korean Park Jong-ah, Jong was the penultimate torchbearer at the 2018 Winter Olympics opening ceremony.

She competed in the Olympics as part of a unified team of 35 players drawn from both North and South Korea. The team's coach was Sarah Murray and the team was in Group B competing against Switzerland, Japan and Sweden.

References

1996 births
Living people
Ice hockey players at the 2018 Winter Olympics
North Korean women's ice hockey forwards
Olympic ice hockey players of North Korea
Winter Olympics competitors for Korea